Bawdsey is a village and civil parish in Suffolk, eastern England. Located on the other side of the river Deben from Felixstowe, it had an estimated population of 340 in 2007, reducing to 276 at the Census 2011.

Bawdsey Manor is notable as the place where radar research took place early in World War II, before moving to Worth Matravers near Swanage in May 1940, and from there to  Malvern, Worcestershire in 1942. Bawdsey had both Chain Home and Chain Home Low early warning radar stations during World War II.

The World War Two defences constructed around Bawdsey Point have been documented. They included a number of pillboxes, landmines and flame fougasse installations. The beaches were protected with extensive barriers of scaffolding.

Bawdsey Cliff SSSI
Bawdsey Cliff is a Site of Special Scientific Interest noted for its geological importance.

See also
Telecommunications Research Establishment
Deben Estuary

References

External links 

Bawdsey Manor
Radar station
Bawdsey Radar Group

Villages in Suffolk
Populated coastal places in Suffolk
Civil parishes in Suffolk